Harold Samuel, Baron Samuel of Wych Cross (23 April 1912 – 28 August 1987) was the founder of Land Securities, one of the United Kingdom's largest property companies.

Early life and family
Born in Finchley in north London and educated at Mill Hill School and the College of Estate Management at Lincoln's Inn Fields, Harold Samuel initially trained to be a surveyor.

He married Edna Nedas in September 1936 and they went on to have three daughters.

Career
He established himself as an estate agent but in 1944 acquired Land Securities Investment Trust, a small property concern owning three modest properties. After World War II he focused on securing bomb sites in Plymouth, Exeter, Hull, Coventry and Bristol and redeveloping them. He built the business into one of the largest companies on the London Stock Exchange.

He was knighted in 1963 and was created a Life Peer on 3 July 1972 taking the title Baron Samuel of Wych Cross, of Wych Cross in the County of Sussex.

He is often credited with coining the tricolon expression "location, location, location", but the phrase was already in common use when he was still quite young.

Other interests
Harold Samuel was an avid art collector. His collection of Dutch paintings, formed for him with the help of the dealer Edward Speelman, was donated to the Mansion House Art Collection by his wife after his death and subsequently displayed at the Barbican and toured the United States while the Mansion House was being renovated. A catalogue of the collection was prepared by Peter C. Sutton and published by Cambridge University Press to accompany the exhibition.

Samuel also became a fellow of Magdalene College, Cambridge, and University College, London.

Death
He died in 1987.

Arms

References

Further reading
 Dutch and Flemish Seventeenth-Century Paintings: The Harold Samuel Collection, Cambridge University Press, 1992 

1912 births
1987 deaths
Life peers
Knights Bachelor
20th-century British businesspeople
People from Finchley
Life peers created by Elizabeth II